Komatsu (written: 小松) is a Japanese surname. Notable people with the surname include:

, a member of the Japanese imperial family
, Japanese actress, fashion model
, model/actress
Erik Komatsu (born 1987), American baseball player
, Japanese voice actor
, professional Go player
, Japanese actor and voice actor
, Japanese diplomat, civil servant and politician
, Japanese samurai of the late Edo period, who went on to become a government official of the early Meiji period
, Japanese actor
, Japanese pop singer
, Japanese actress
, Japanese footballer
, Japanese voice actress
, Japanese science fiction writer and screenwriter
, Japanese baseball player
, Japanese footballer
, Japanese baseball player
, Imperial Japanese Navy admiral
, Japanese pop singer

See also
Komatsuhime (1573–1620), Japanese woman of the late Azuchi-Momoyama through early Edo periods

Japanese-language surnames